Crigglestone is a village and civil parish in the City of Wakefield in West Yorkshire, England. It is recorded as "Crigeston" (along with neighbouring "Orberie") in the Domesday Book. The civil parish had a population of 9,271 at the 2011 Census. On 29 July 1941, an explosion occurred at the Crigglestone Colliery, killing 21 men. Since the 1970s, the site of the colliery has become an industrial estate on the western side, giving way to residential housing on the eastern side and a public amenity (Betty Eastwood Park) to the south.

This area has two Anglican churches: the Church of St James, Chapelthorpe, and the Church of St John the Divine, Calder Grove.

Crigglestone once had two railway stations, both of which are now closed. Crigglestone West was on the line between Sheffield and Leeds via Wakefield, Crigglestone East on the closed and lifted line between Thornhill and Royston Junction.

See also
Listed buildings in Crigglestone
Horbury
Crofton, West Yorkshire

References

External links 

 Crigglestone Parish Council website
 Crigglestone on any-village.co.uk (includes map)

Suburbs of Wakefield
Civil parishes in West Yorkshire